The 2023 Joe McDonagh Cup is due to be the sixth staging of the Joe McDonagh Cup since its establishment by the Gaelic Athletic Association in 2018.

Antrim, winner of the 2022 final, were promoted to the Leinster Senior Hurling Championship, replaced by Laois who were relegated back to this competition. Kildare were promoted from the Christy Ring Cup.

The top 2 teams from the round robin stage will play off in the final to decide the winner. Both will advance to the 2023 All-Ireland Senior Hurling Championship knock-out stages. The bottom team will be relegated to Christy Ring Cup.

Team changes

To Championship
Relegated from the All-Ireland Senior Hurling Championship

 Laois

Promoted from the Christy Ring Cup

 Kildare

From Championship
Promoted to the All-Ireland Senior Hurling Championship

 Antrim

Relegated to the Christy Ring Cup

 Meath

Teams

Stadiums and locations

Personnel and kits

General Information

Group stage

Final

If the winners are from Leinster or Ulster, they qualify for the 2024 All-Ireland Senior Hurling Championship. If  win, they will play a playoff against the last-placed team in the 2023 Munster Senior Hurling Championship, with the winner qualifying for the 2024 All-Ireland Senior Hurling Championship.

Statistics

Top scorers
Top scorer overall

In a single game

Scoring events
 Widest winning margin: 0 points

 Most goals in a match: 0

 Most points in a match: 0

 Most goals by one team in a match: 0

 Most points by one team in a match: 0

 Highest aggregate score: 0 points

 Lowest aggregate score: 0 points

Miscellaneous
First-time Joe McDonagh Cup meetings:
 Down v Kildare (group stage)
 Down v Laois (group stage)
 Kerry v Kildare (group stage)
 Kildare v Laois (group stage)
 Kildare v Offaly (group stage)

References

Joe McDonagh Cup
Joe McDonagh Cup
Joe McDonagh Cup